Stigler is a city in and county seat of Haskell County, Oklahoma. The population was 2,685 at the time of the 2010 census, down from 2,731 recorded in 2000.

History
At the time of its founding, Newman, later Stigler, was located in Sans Bois County, a part of the Moshulatubbee District of the Choctaw Nation in Indian Territory. A post office was established at Newman, Indian Territory on April 30, 1892. The community was named for Dr. Martin W. Newman, a pioneer and physician.

Joseph Stigler is said to have founded the town in 1889. He was familiar with the area, as earlier he had served as a deputy marshal under federal judge Isaac Parker, whose court in Fort Smith, Arkansas, had jurisdiction over Indian Territory. The post office name was changed to Stigler on May 3, 1893 by the U.S. Post Office Service, because the former name caused some confusion with the town of Norman.

The Midland Valley Railroad was constructed to Stigler in 1904, which attracted more settlers and more types of businesses. By the following year, the town had become incorporated. At statehood in 1907, Stigler was named as the county seat of newly created Haskell County.

Stigler is home to the Haskell County Courthouse. In the late 20th century, the county court was known for having installed marble plaques inscribed with the Ten Commandments and the Mayflower Compact on the front lawn of the courthouse. (See Separation of church and state in the United States.) In the seventh commandment, the word "adultery" was misspelled as "adultry". Opponents sued for the commandments to be removed, arguing that the installation was unconstitutional and violated the principle of the separation of church and state in the United States. The court agreed and ordered the Commandments removed from the lawn. However, it was only moved over about 20 feet and is basically still on the lawn of the courthouse.

Geography
Stigler is located in central Haskell County at  (35.256357, -95.124105). Oklahoma State Highway 9 is the city's Main Street, and leads east  to Keota and west  to Whitefield. Oklahoma State Highway 82 leads south from Stigler  to Lequire.

Demographics

As of the census of 2000, there were 2,731 people, 1,096 households, and 697 families residing in the city. The population density was 1,237.6 people per square mile (477.1/km). There were 1,216 housing units at an average density of 551.0 per square mile (212.4/km). The racial makeup of the city was 78.76% White, 0.04% African American, 15.45% Native American, 0.33% Asian, 0.59% from other races, and 4.83% from two or more races. Hispanic or Latino of any race were 2.67% of the population.

There were 1,096 households, out of which 32.4% had children under the age of 18 living with them, 47.6% were married couples living together, 13.4% had a female householder with no husband present, and 36.4% were non-families. 33.9% of all households were made up of individuals, and 20.3% had someone living alone who was 65 years of age or older. The average household size was 2.36 and the average family size was 3.06.

In the city, the population was spread out, with 26.3% under the age of 18, 9.3% from 18 to 24, 24.5% from 25 to 44, 18.6% from 45 to 64, and 21.3% who were 65 years of age or older. The median age was 36 years. For every 100 females, there were 81.0 males. For every 100 females age 18 and over, there were 74.4 males.

The median income for a household in the city was $19,594, and the median income for a family was $28,839. Males had a median income of $24,350 versus $22,500 for females. The per capita income for the city was $16,293. About 20.5% of families and 25.8% of the population were below the poverty line, including 33.1% of those under age 18 and 18.1% of those age 65 or over.

Economy
Stigler prospered through agriculture during the early part of the 20th century. However, cotton and corn could not sustain the town through the Great Depression of the 1930s. According to the Encyclopedia of Oklahoma History and Culture, local farmers became raisers of livestock, largely with the assistance of the federal government. After World War II, construction of two large new reservoirs in the region, Eufaula Lake and Robert S. Kerr Reservoir, generated many jobs in construction, followed by an upsurge of tourism to the area. Stigler also succeeded in attracting several small manufacturing plants.

It currently houses seven employers, with a total of 194 employees.

Education

Public schools
The Stigler Board of Education is responsible for the Stigler School System, which consists of one grade school, one middle school and one high school. The Board of Education has five members and meets monthly.

Kiamichi Technology Center
One campus of the Kiamichi Technology Center (KTC) is located at 1410 Old Military Road in Stigler. The Stigler branch offers training programs in automobile service technology, construction technology, cosmetology, emergency medical services, health science and welding technology.

Transportation

Air
It went into service in January 1997, for private aircraft. There is no control tower and no scheduled airline service.

Transportation
Stigler is at the intersection of Oklahoma State Highway 9 and Oklahoma State Highway 82.

KI BOIS Area Transit System (KATS) is a rural public transportation system that operates over 200 buses and vans that transport people to senior citizens centers, grocery stores, doctors, and work. KATS serves residents of Adair, Cherokee, Haskell, Hughes, Latimer, LeFlore, McIntosh, Okmulgee, Okfuskee, Pittsburg, Sequoyah and Wagoner counties. Its administrative office and maintenance facility is in Stigler.

Governance

City council
Stigler has a council-manager form of government. City officials are:
 Founder of Stigler - Joseph Stigler
 Mayor - Larry Godfrey
 Vice Mayor - Brad Martin
 Council Member - Brian Morrison
 Council Member - William "Bill" Allen
 Council Member - Rebecca "Becky" Bumpers
 City Manager - Bobby Mouser
 Sheriff - Tim Turner

City departments
 Police Department Richard Dickson is police chief and Kenny Medlock is 911 Director. There are 9 full-time and 4 part-time officers,4 full-time and 1 part-time Dispatchers.
 Fire Department consists of Fire Chief Jim Pearson and 18 volunteer firefighters.

Media
Stigler has had several newspapers, starting with the Stigler Beacon, which was followed by the State Sentinel. Others have been the Haskell County Leader, the Haskell County News, the Haskell County Tribune, the Country Star, and the Stigler News-Sentinel.

Notable people
 Norma Howard, Choctaw contemporary painter
 Ted Risenhoover (1934-2006), born in Stigler and graduated from Stigler High School in 1952. A newspaper publisher, he represented the Second Congressional District in the U. S. Congress from 1975 to 1979.
 William G. Stigler (1891 - 1952), lived and was buried in Stigler. He was the son of founder Joseph Stigler. After graduating from the University of Oklahoma law school, he became a lawyer and represented the Second Congressional District in the U. S. Congress from 1944 to 1952.

Notes

References

External links
 City of Stigler official website
 Stigler Public Library

Cities in Haskell County, Oklahoma
Cities in Oklahoma
County seats in Oklahoma
Populated places established in 1889